α-Olefin sulfonates (also: alpha-olefin sulfonates or AOS) are a group of anionic surfactants, which are used as detergents. The compounds contain a - mostly linear, primary - alkyl R and a monovalent cation M, preferably sodium. The most frequently used example of this group of substances is sodium α-olefin sulfonate (INCI: Sodium C14-16 Olefin Sulfonate).

Production and composition 
α-Olefin sulfonates are produced by sulfonation of alpha-olefins, typically using sulfur trioxide. Subsequent alkaline hydrolysis gives a mixture of alkene sulfonates (60-65%) and hydroxyalkane sulfonates (35-40%). The commercially available olefin sulfonates are mostly solutions with about 40% active ingredient content.

Description 
In addition to a longer hydrocarbon chain in which there must be at least one double bond (hence the name "olefin"), it has an anionic sulfonate headgroup with a sodium ion as a counterion. The sulfonate group is negative in aqueous solution, which is why the α-olefin sulfonates are among the anionic surfactants. In contrast to most other surfactants in which the C12-alkyl chains have the highest surface activity, olefin sulfonates shows maximal activity when using C14and C16-olefins.

Usage 
α-Olefin sulfonates with linear alkenyl radicals from C12 to C18 are used as anionic surfactants in various areas of application due to their  and foam stability (even with high water hardness), excellent fat-dissolving power and oil dissolving power as well as a favorable ecological profile and low aquatic toxicity and human toxicity. They are typically used in detergents and cleaning agents, for degreasing, in the emulsion polymerization, the conditioning of concrete and mortar as well as in the formulation of pesticides.

Sodium C14-16 olefin sulfonate is being introduced in some shampoos as an alternative to sodium laureth sulfate. Some groups and sellers suggest that it is better for someones health, but this claim lacks evidence.

References 

Alkene derivatives
Sulfonates
Anionic surfactants